The 2015–16 St. John's Red Storm men's basketball team represented St. John's University during the 2015–16 NCAA Division I men's basketball season. They were coached by alumni and Naismith Memorial Basketball Hall of Fame member Chris Mullin in his first year at the school. 
St. John's home games were played at Carnesecca Arena and Madison Square Garden and was a member of the Big East Conference.

They finished the season with a record of 8–24, 1–17 in Big East play to finish in last place in conference. They lost to Marquette in the first round of the Big East tournament.

Previous season
The Red Storm finished the 2014–15 season with a record of 21–12, 10–8 in Big East play to finish in fifth place in conference. They lost in the quarterfinals of the Big East tournament to Providence. They received an at-large bid to the NCAA tournament where they lost in the second round to San Diego State.

Offseason

Departures

2015 recruiting class

Transfer additions

2016 Recruiting class

Roster

Schedule and results

|-
!colspan=9 style=| Exhibition

|-
!colspan=9 style=| Non-conference regular season

|-
!colspan=9 style=""|Big East regular season

|-
! colspan=9 style=|Big East tournament

References

St. John's
St. John's Red Storm men's basketball seasons
Saint John's
Saint John's